The City of Stirling in Perth, Western Australia was originally established on 12 February 1871 as the Perth Road Board with a chairman and councillors under the Roads Boards Act 1871. With the passage of the Local Government Act 1960, all road boards became Shires with a shire president and councillors effective 1 July 1961. The Shire of Perth was declared a city and renamed Stirling on 24 January 1971.

The method of electing the Mayor was changed in 2017, after a referendum on the issue at the October 2017 council election. Starting in 2019, the Mayor was elected at elections by residents, as opposed to the previous system, where the Mayor is elected by councillors at a meeting following each election.

Perth Road Board

Shire of Perth

City of Stirling

References

Bibliography
 
 

Lists of local government leaders in Western Australia
City of Stirling